Chekhov's Journey is a novel by Ian Watson published in 1983.

Plot summary
Chekhov's Journey is a novel in which a modern-day actor uses hypnosis to simulate Anton Chekhov's 1890 journey through Siberia.

Reception
Dave Langford reviewed Chekhov's Journey for White Dwarf #40, and stated that "There are good twists in this neatly executed story, which is as 'conventional' a reality-bending yarn as Watson has written. Lacking the vaulting ambition of his God's World or the outrageousness of the recent Deathhunter, it's good entertainment with some philosophical bite."

Reviews
Review by Faren Miller (1983) in Locus, #267 April 1983 
Review by Nick Lowe (1983) in Foundation, #28 July 1983 
Review by John Clute (1983) in Interzone, #5 Autumn 1983 
Review by Tom Easton (1990) in Analog Science Fiction and Fact, July 1990 
Review by Don D'Ammassa (1991) in Science Fiction Chronicle, #140 June 1991

References

1983 British novels
British science fiction novels
Victor Gollancz Ltd books